I Want More (subtitled Dexter in Radioland Vol. 4) is a live album by American saxophonist Dexter Gordon recorded at the Jazzhus Montmartre in Copenhagen, Denmark in 1964 by Danmarks Radio and released on the SteepleChase label in 1980.

Critical reception 

AllMusic critic Scott Yanow stated "Fans will want all of the releases in this enjoyable and well-recorded series".

Track listing 
All compositions by Dexter Gordon except where noted.

 Introduction by Dexter Gordon – 0:30
 "I Want More" – 11:05
 "Come Rain or Come Shine" (Harold Arlen, Johnny Mercer) – 12:01
 "Where Are You?" (Jimmy McHugh, Harold Adamson) – 9:32
 "I Want to Blow Now" (Bennie Green) – 11:56
 "Second Balcony Jump" (Billy Eckstine, Gerald Valentine) – 5:26

Personnel 
Dexter Gordon – tenor saxophone, vocals
Tete Montoliu – piano
Niels-Henning Ørsted Pedersen – bass
Rune Carlsson – drums

References 

SteepleChase Records live albums
Dexter Gordon live albums
1980 live albums
Albums recorded at Jazzhus Montmartre